Richland Mall is a  regional shopping mall in Waco, Texas owned by CBL & Associates Properties located on . The mall opened in 1980. It has 95 stores with five anchors. The anchor stores are JCPenney, Dick's Sporting Goods, 2 Dillard's stores, Tilt Studio, and Shoe Dept. There is one vacant anchor store that was once Dillard's.

The mall contains two Dillard's stores, one of which was originally H. J. Wilson Co. and later Service Merchandise.

On December 28, 2018, it was announced that Sears would be closing as part of a plan to close 80 stores nationwide. The store closed in March 2019. Dillard's has since renovated the former Sears space and moved one of its store into it. The new store opened in May 2020.

 Bealls' parent company announced in September 2019 that it would be converting the Bealls name to Gordmans. However, in May 2020, Gordmans announced that it was filing for Chapter 11 bankruptcy and that it would be closing all locations as the chain is now going out of business. The location was filled by a Tilt Studio family entertainment center in 2021.

Anchors
JCPenney
Dillard's (2 locations)
Tilt Studio (former Gordmans)
Dick's Sporting Goods

References

External links

Shopping malls in Texas
Buildings and structures in Waco, Texas
Shopping malls established in 1980
CBL Properties
Tourist attractions in Waco, Texas
1980 establishments in Texas